Algoma is an unincorporated community in McDowell County, West Virginia, United States. Algoma is located adjacent to the town of Northfork. Its post office was established in 1891 and discontinued in 1988. Algoma most likely was derived from the Algonquin language.

The Algoma Coal and Coke Company Store was listed on the National Register of Historic Places in 1992.

References

Unincorporated communities in McDowell County, West Virginia
Unincorporated communities in West Virginia
Coal towns in West Virginia